The following is a list of Major League Baseball players born in European nations.

Austria 

Austria, officially the Republic of Austria, is a landlocked country in Central Europe.

Austrian Empire 

The Austrian Empire was a modern era successor empire centered on what is today's Austria and which officially lasted from 1804 to 1867.

Austria-Hungary 

Austria-Hungary was a monarchic union between the crowns of the Austrian Empire and the Kingdom of Hungary in Central Europe. The union was a result of the Ausgleich or Compromise of 1867, under which the Austrian House of Habsburg agreed to share power with the separate Hungarian government, dividing the territory of the former Austrian Empire between them. The Dual Monarchy had existed for 51 years when it dissolved on October 31, 1918 following military defeat in the First World War.

Republic of Austria

The First Austrian Republic was established in 1919. In the 1938 Anschluss, Austria was occupied and annexed by Nazi Germany. This lasted until the end of World War II in 1945, after which Austria was occupied by the Allies and its former democratic constitution was restored. In 1955, the Austrian State Treaty re-established Austria as a sovereign state, ending the occupation.

Belgium 

Belgium, officially the Kingdom of Belgium, is a state in Western Europe. The 1830 Belgian Revolution led to the establishment of an independent, Belgium under a provisional government and a national congress. Since the installation of Leopold I as king in 1831, Belgium has been a constitutional monarchy and parliamentary democracy.

Denmark 

Denmark, officially the Kingdom of Denmark together with Greenland and the Faroe Islands, is a Scandinavian country in Northern Europe.

Finland

Grand Duchy of Finland 

The Grand Duchy of Finland was the predecessor state of modern Finland. It existed between 1809 and 1917 as an autonomous part of the Russian Empire and was ruled by the Russian Emperor as Grand Duke.

France 

France, officially the French Republic, is a sovereign country in Western Europe that extends from the Mediterranean to the English Channel and the North Sea, and from the Rhine to the Atlantic Ocean.

French Second Republic 

The French Second Republic was the republican government of France between the 1848 Revolution and the 1851 coup by Louis-Napoléon Bonaparte which initiated the Second Empire.

Second French Empire 

The Second French Empire was the Imperial Bonapartist regime of Napoleon III from 1852 to 1870, between the Second Republic and the Third Republic, in France.

French Third Republic 

The French Third Republic was France from 1870, when the Second French Empire collapsed, to 1940, when France's defeat by Nazi Germany led to the Vichy France government. Vichy was replaced by the French Fourth Republic.

French Fourth Republic 

The French Fourth Republic was the republican government of France between 1946 and 1958, governed by the fourth republican constitution. France adopted the constitution of the Fourth Republic on 13 October 1946.

French Fifth Republic 

The Fifth Republic is the fifth and current republican constitution of France, introduced on 4 October 1958. The Fifth Republic emerged from the collapse of the French Fourth Republic, replacing the prior parliamentary government with a semi-presidential system.

Germany

German Confederation 

The German Confederation was the association of Central European states created by the Congress of Vienna in 1815 to serve as the successor to the Holy Roman Empire of the German Nation, which had been abolished in 1806. The dispute between the two dominant member states of the confederation, Austria and Prussia, over which of the two had the inherent right to rule German lands ended in favor of Prussia after the Austro-Prussian War in 1866, and the collapse of the confederation. This resulted in the creation of the North German Confederation, with a number of south German states remaining independent, although allied first with Austria (until 1867) and subsequently with Prussia (until 1871), after which they became a part of the new nation of Germany.

German Empire 

The German Empire refers to Germany from the unification of Germany and proclamation of Wilhelm I as German Emperor on 18 January 1871 to 1918, when it became a federal republic after defeat in World War I and the abdication of Wilhelm II (9 November 1918).

Soviet Zone of Germany 

The Soviet Occupation Zone was the area of central Germany occupied by the Soviet Union from 1945 on, at the end of World War II. On 7 October 1949 the German Democratic Republic, which became commonly referred to as East Germany, was established in the Soviet Occupation Zone.

West Germany 

West Germany is the common English name for the Federal Republic of Germany or FRG in the period between its creation in May 1949 to German reunification on 3 October 1990. During this period, the NATO-aligned West Germany and the socialist East Germany were divided by the Inner German border. This situation ended when East Germany was dissolved and its five states joined the ten states of the Federal Republic of Germany along with the reunified city-state of Berlin.

Germany
Germany is the English short name for the Federal Republic of Germany, the enlarged continuation of West Germany following German reunification in 1990.

Greece

Kingdom of Greece 

The Kingdom of Greece was a state established in 1832 at the Convention of London by the Great Powers (the United Kingdom, France and the Russian Empire). It was internationally recognized by the Treaty of Constantinople, where it also secured full independence from the Ottoman Empire. The Kingdom succeeded from the Greek provisional governments after the Greek War of Independence, and lasted until 1924. In 1924 the monarchy was abolished, and the Second Hellenic Republic was established.

Ireland 
Covers players born in the Republic of Ireland and also those born in the United Kingdom of Great Britain and Ireland prior to partition. At present, all players here were born prior to 1922, so are also included in the category of Major League Baseball players born in the United Kingdom.

Italy

Kingdom of Italy
The Kingdom of Italy was a state forged in 1861 by the unification of Italy. It existed until 1946 when the Italians opted for a republican constitution.

The Republic of Italy
Italy became a republic after a referendum held on 2 June 1946, a day since celebrated as Republic Day.

Lithuania

Netherlands

Norway

Poland

Portugal

Russia

Russian Empire

Soviet Union 

The Union of Soviet Socialist Republics (USSR) was a constitutionally socialist state that existed in Eurasia from 1922 to 1991. The common short name is Soviet Union

Slovakia

Czechoslovakia 

Czechoslovakia was a sovereign state in Central Europe which existed from October 1918, when it declared its independence from the Austro-Hungarian Empire, until 1992. On 1 January 1993 Czechoslovakia peacefully split into the Czech Republic and Slovakia.

† Carl Linhart was born in a town called Zborov. Since there are towns of that name in both Slovakia and the Czech Republic, it is unclear which current nation can claim him.

Spain

Sweden

Switzerland

United Kingdom

England 

England is one of the four constituent nations of the United Kingdom. It shares land borders with Scotland to the north and Wales to the west; the Irish Sea is to the north west, the Celtic Sea to the south west and the North Sea to the east, with the English Channel to the south separating it from continental Europe. Most of England comprises the central and southern part of the island of Great Britain in the North Atlantic.

Scotland 

Scotland is one of the four constituent nations of the United Kingdom. It shares a land borders with England to the south and comprises the northern part of the island of Great Britain in the North Atlantic.

Northern Ireland 

Northern Ireland is one of the four constituent nations of the United Kingdom. It shares a land border with the Republic of Ireland to the south and is one of two nations on the island of Ireland.

See also Ireland (above) as all players on that list were born in the United Kingdom of Great Britain and Ireland prior to partition, prior to 1922.

Wales 

Wales is one of the four constituent nations of the United Kingdom. It shares a land borders with England to the east; to the west is the Irish Sea.

References 

Lists of Major League Baseball players by national origin
Major League Baseball players